Larto is an unincorporated community in Catahoula Parish, Louisiana, United States.

Notes

Unincorporated communities in Catahoula Parish, Louisiana
Unincorporated communities in Louisiana